UTC−09:30 is an identifier for a time offset from UTC of −09:30. This time is used in French Polynesia.

As standard time (year-round)
Principal settlement: Taiohae

Oceania

Pacific Ocean

Polynesia 
France
French Polynesia
Marquesas Islands
Northern Marquesas
Southern Marquesas

References 

UTC offsets

es:Huso horario#UTC−09:30, V†